Kōpuaranga, previously called Dreyerton, is a rural locality. in the Wairarapa region of New Zealand's North Island, between Masterton and Mauriceville.

Etymology 
The name Kōpuaranga comes from Māori words meaning 'deep hole' and 'shoal of fish'.

History 
The area was a temporary camp used by Scandinavians who had been brought in to clear and settle the Seventy Mile Bush, but could not take up their allotted land until it had been surveyed, and the area was thus known simply as The Camp or The Scandinavian Camp, the camp was officially closed on 31 December 1873, and an estimated 700 people had occupied the camp during its existence.

In 1876 a Post Office was opened, named Opaki, however the settlement's name was changed to Dreyerton in 1881, after Danish interpreter Alexander Svend Dreyer, who had accompanied the pioneers and conceived the idea for a township.

Dreyerton school was founded in 1885, and in 1897 the school had an average attendance of about forty. One amusing incident during the school's history was the school committee election of 1889, which fell through when only the committee members arrived, and refused to vote for themselves. The school was closed in 1975.

The name was changed to Kopuaranga in 1906, after the government assigned railway stations Māori language names. The Wellington Education Board then changed the name of the local school to match the station, and the name of the settlement changed also. Kopuaranga railway station eventually closed in 1983. In December 2019, the approved official geographic name of the locality was gazetted as "Kōpuaranga".

Demographics 

Kōpuaranga had a population of 915 at the 2018 New Zealand census, an increase of 60 people (7.0%) since the 2013 census, and an increase of 144 people (18.7%) since the 2006 census. There were 348 households. There were 459 males and 456 females, giving a sex ratio of 1.01 males per female. The median age was 45.3 years (compared with 37.4 years nationally), with 177 people (19.3%) aged under 15 years, 126 (13.8%) aged 15 to 29, 453 (49.5%) aged 30 to 64, and 159 (17.4%) aged 65 or older.

Ethnicities were 91.8% European/Pākehā, 10.2% Māori, 1.3% Pacific peoples, 2.3% Asian, and 2.6% other ethnicities (totals add to more than 100% since people could identify with multiple ethnicities).

The proportion of people born overseas was 15.4%, compared with 27.1% nationally.

Although some people objected to giving their religion, 56.1% had no religion, 33.4% were Christian, 0.7% were Buddhist and 1.6% had other religions.

Of those at least 15 years old, 153 (20.7%) people had a bachelor or higher degree, and 126 (17.1%) people had no formal qualifications. The median income was $35,400, compared with $31,800 nationally. The employment status of those at least 15 was that 390 (52.8%) people were employed full-time, 153 (20.7%) were part-time, and 12 (1.6%) were unemployed.

References 

Masterton District
Populated places in the Wellington Region